Barigan Creek, a watercourse of the Hunter River catchment, is located in the Central Tablelands region of New South Wales, Australia.

Course
The Barigan Creek rises below Mount Stormy, on the eastern slopes of the Great Dividing Range. The river descends  over its  course.

See also

 List of rivers of Australia
 List of rivers of New South Wales (A-K)
 Rivers of New South Wales

References

External links
 

Rivers of New South Wales
Central Tablelands